Kayamandi Secondary School is a Xhosa-medium school serving grades 8–12 located in Kayamandi, Stellenbosch, in the Western Cape region of South Africa. The Western Cape Education Department categorizes it as the only purely Xhosa-speaking secondary school in the region.

As of 2006 the school had some 1,493 students.

References 
 Western Cape Education Department profile accessed 27 October 2006

Further reading 
 Disadvantaged School Gets Computer Centre published by the Ministry of Education (Provincial Government of the Western Cape on 7 September 2004

Schools in the Western Cape
Stellenbosch
Xhosa culture
Educational institutions with year of establishment missing